USS Nautilus (SSN-571) was the world's first operational nuclear-powered submarine and the first submarine to complete a submerged transit of the North Pole on 3 August 1958.  Her initial commanding officer was Eugene "Dennis" Wilkinson, a widely respected naval officer who set the stage for many of the protocols of today's Nuclear Navy of the US, and who had a storied career during military service and afterwards.

Sharing a name with Captain Nemo's fictional submarine in Jules Verne's classic 1870 science fiction novel Twenty Thousand Leagues Under the Sea and the  that served with distinction in World War II, the new nuclear-powered Nautilus was authorized in 1951. Construction began in 1952, and the boat was launched in January 1954, sponsored by Mamie Eisenhower, First Lady of the United States, wife of 34th President Dwight D. Eisenhower; it was commissioned the following September into the United States Navy. Nautilus was delivered to the Navy in 1955.

Because her nuclear propulsion allowed her to remain submerged far longer than diesel-electric submarines, she broke many records in her first years of operation and traveled to locations previously beyond the limits of submarines. In operation, she revealed a number of limitations in her design and construction. This information was used to improve subsequent submarines.

Nautilus was decommissioned in 1980 and designated a National Historic Landmark in 1982. The submarine has been preserved as a museum ship at the Submarine Force Library and Museum in Groton, Connecticut, where the vessel receives around 250,000 visitors per year.

Planning and construction

The conceptual design of the first nuclear submarine began in March 1950 as project SCB 64. In July 1951, the United States Congress authorized the construction of a nuclear-powered submarine for the U.S. Navy, which was planned and personally supervised by Captain (later Admiral) Hyman G. Rickover, USN, known as the "Father of the Nuclear Navy." On 12 December 1951, the US Department of the Navy announced that the submarine would be called Nautilus, the fourth U.S. Navy vessel officially so named.  The boat carried the hull number SSN-571. She benefited from the Greater Underwater Propulsion Power (GUPPY) improvements to the American Gato-, Balao-, and Tench-class submarines.

Nautiluss keel was laid at General Dynamics' Electric Boat Division in Groton, Connecticut, by Harry S. Truman on 14 June 1952. She was christened on 21 January 1954 and launched into the Thames River, sponsored by Mamie Eisenhower. Nautilus was commissioned on 30 September 1954, under the command of Commander Eugene P. Wilkinson, USN.

Nautilus was powered by the Submarine Thermal Reactor (STR), later redesignated the S2W reactor, a pressurized water reactor produced for the US Navy by Westinghouse Electric Corporation. Bettis Atomic Power Laboratory, operated by Westinghouse, developed the basic reactor plant design used in Nautilus after being given the assignment on 31 December 1947 to design a nuclear power plant for a submarine. Nuclear power had a crucial advantage in submarine propulsion because it is a zero-emission process that consumes no air. This design is the basis for nearly all of the US nuclear-powered submarine and surface combat ships, and was adapted by other countries for naval nuclear propulsion. The first actual prototype (for Nautilus) was constructed and tested by the Argonne National Laboratory in 1953 at S1W at the Naval Reactors Facility, part of the National Reactor Testing Station in Idaho.

Nautilus''' ship's patch was designed by The Walt Disney Company, and her wardroom currently displays a set of tableware made of zirconium, as the nuclear fuel cladding was partly made of zirconium.

"Underway on nuclear power"
Following her commissioning, Nautilus remained dockside for further construction and testing.  On the morning of 17 January 1955, at 11 am EST, Nautilus first Commanding Officer, Commander Eugene P. Wilkinson, ordered all lines cast off and signaled the memorable and historic message, "Underway on nuclear power." On 10 May, she headed south for shakedown. Submerged throughout, she traveled  from New London to San Juan, Puerto Rico and covered  in less than ninety hours. At the time, this was the longest submerged cruise by a submarine and at the highest sustained speed (for at least one hour) ever recorded.

From 1955 to 1957, Nautilus continued to be used to investigate the effects of increased submerged speeds and endurance. These improvements rendered the progress made in anti-submarine warfare during World War II virtually obsolete. Radar and anti-submarine aircraft, which had proved crucial in defeating submarines during the war, proved ineffective against a vessel able to move quickly out of an area, change depth quickly and stay submerged for very long periods.

On 4 February 1957, Nautilus logged her 60,000th nautical mile, matching the endurance of her namesake, the fictional Nautilus described in Jules Verne's novel Twenty Thousand Leagues Under The Sea. In May, she departed for the Pacific Coast to participate in coastal exercises and the fleet exercise, operation "Home Run," which acquainted units of the Pacific Fleet with the capabilities of nuclear submarines.Nautilus returned to New London, Connecticut, on 21 July and departed again on 19 August for her first voyage of  under the polar pack ice. Thereafter, she headed for the Eastern Atlantic to participate in NATO exercises and conduct a tour of various British and French ports where she was inspected by defense personnel of those countries. She arrived back at New London on 28 October, underwent upkeep, and then conducted coastal operations until the spring.

Operation Sunshine – under the North Pole
In response to the nuclear ICBM threat posed by Sputnik, President Eisenhower ordered the U.S. Navy to attempt a submarine transit of the North Pole to gain credibility for the soon-to-come SLBM weapons system. On 25 April 1958, Nautilus was underway again for the West Coast, now commanded by Commander William R. Anderson, USN. Stopping at San Diego, San Francisco, and Seattle, she began her history-making polar transit, "Operation Sunshine", as she departed the latter port on 9 June. On 19 June, she entered the Chukchi Sea, but was turned back by deep drift ice in those shallow waters. On 28 June, she arrived at Pearl Harbor to await better ice conditions.

By 23 July, her wait was over, and she set a course northward. She submerged in the Barrow Sea Valley on 1 August and on 3 August, at 2315 hrs. EDT she became the first watercraft to reach the geographic North Pole. From the North Pole, she continued and after 96 hours and  under the ice, surfaced northeast of Greenland, having completed the first successful submerged voyage around the North Pole. The technical details of this mission were planned by scientists from the Naval Electronics Laboratory including Dr. Waldo Lyon who accompanied Nautilus as chief scientist and ice pilot.

Navigation beneath the arctic ice sheet was difficult.  Above 85°N both magnetic compasses and normal gyrocompasses become inaccurate. A special gyrocompass built by Sperry Rand was installed shortly before the journey. There was a risk that the submarine would become disoriented beneath the ice and that the crew would have to play "longitude roulette". Commander Anderson had considered using torpedoes to blow a hole in the ice if the submarine needed to surface.

The most difficult part of the journey was in the Bering Strait. During the initial attempt to go through the Bering Strait, there was insufficient room between the ice and the sea bottom. During the second, successful attempt to pass through the Bering passage, the submarine passed through a known channel close to Alaska (this was not the first choice, as the submarine wanted to avoid detection).

The trip beneath the ice cap was an important boost for America as the Soviets had recently launched Sputnik, but had no nuclear submarine of their own. During the address announcing the journey, the president mentioned that one day nuclear cargo submarines might use that route for trade.

As Nautilus proceeded south from Greenland, a helicopter airlifted Commander Anderson to connect with transport to Washington, D.C.  At a White House ceremony on 8 August, President Eisenhower presented him with the Legion of Merit and announced that the crew had earned a Presidential Unit Citation.

At her next port of call, the Isle of Portland, England, she received the Unit Citation, the first ever issued in peace time, from American Ambassador JH Whitney, and then crossed the Atlantic reaching New London, Connecticut, on 29 October. For the remainder of the year, Nautilus operated from her home port of New London.

Operational history

Following fleet exercises in early 1959, Nautilus entered the Portsmouth Naval Shipyard in Kittery, Maine, for her first complete overhaul (28 May 1959 – 15 August 1960). Overhaul was followed by refresher training and on 24 October she departed New London for her first deployment with the Sixth Fleet in the Mediterranean Sea, returning to her home-port on 16 December.Nautilus spent most of her career assigned to Submarine Squadron 10 (SUBRON 10) at State Pier in New London, Connecticut.  Nautilus and other submarines in the squadron made their home tied up alongside the tender, where they received preventive maintenance, and if necessary, repairs, from the well-equipped submarine tender USS Fulton (AS-11) and her crew of machinists, millwrights, and other craftsmen.Nautilus operated in the Atlantic, conducting evaluation tests for ASW improvements, participating in NATO exercises, and during October 1962, in the naval quarantine of Cuba, until she headed east again for a two-month Mediterranean tour in August 1963. On her return she joined in fleet exercises until entering the Portsmouth Naval Shipyard for her second overhaul on 17 January 1964.

On 2 May 1966, Nautilus returned to her homeport to resume operations with the Atlantic Fleet, and at some point during that month, logged her 300,000th nautical mile underway. For the next year and a quarter she conducted special operations for ComSubLant and then in August 1967, returned to Portsmouth, for another year's stay. During an exercise in 1966 she collided with the aircraft carrier  on 10 November, while at shallow depth. Following repairs in Portsmouth she conducted exercises off the southeastern seaboard. She returned to New London in December 1968 and operated as a unit of Submarine Squadron 10 for most of the remainder of her career.

On 9 April 1979, Nautilus set out from Groton, Connecticut on her final voyage under the command of Richard A. Riddell. She reached Mare Island Naval Shipyard of Vallejo, California on 26 May 1979, her last day underway. She was decommissioned and stricken from the Naval Vessel Register on 3 March 1980.

Noise
Toward the end of her service, the hull and sail of Nautilus vibrated sufficiently that sonar became ineffective at more than  speed. As noise generation is extremely undesirable in submarines, this made the vessel vulnerable to sonar detection. Lessons learned from this problem were applied to later nuclear submarines.

Awards and commendations

Presidential Unit Citation

To commemorate the first submerged voyage under the North Pole, all Nautilus crewmembers who made the voyage may wear a Presidential Unit Citation ribbon with a special clasp in the form of a gold block letter N (image above).

MuseumNautilus was designated a National Historic Landmark by the United States Secretary of the Interior on 20 May 1982. and

She was named as the official state ship of Connecticut in 1983. Following an extensive conversion at Mare Island Naval Shipyard, Nautilus was towed back to Groton, under the command of Captain John Almon, arriving on 6 July 1985. On 11 April 1986, Nautilus opened to the public as part of the Submarine Force Library and Museum.Nautilus now serves as a museum of submarine history operated by the Naval History and Heritage Command. The ship underwent a five-month preservation in 2002 at Electric Boat, at a cost of approximately $4.7 million. Nautilus attracts some 250,000 visitors annually to her present berth near Naval Submarine Base New London.Nautilus celebrated the 50th anniversary of her commissioning on 30 September 2004 with a ceremony that included a speech from Vice Admiral Eugene P. Wilkinson, her first Commanding Officer, and a designation of the ship as an American Nuclear Society National Nuclear Landmark.

Visitors may tour the forward two compartments, with guidance from an automated system. Despite similar alterations to exhibit the engineering spaces, tours aft of the control room are not permitted due to safety and security concerns.

In March of 2022, Nautilus began a restoration process that was expected to last 6 to 8 months. Included in the work: blasting and painting of the hull, installation of new top decks, as well as upgraded interior lighting and electrical. The restoration was completed at a cost of US$36 million.

See also
 (first submarine to surface at the North Pole)
National Register of Historic Places listings in New London County, Connecticut
List of museum ships
Submarine Cargo Vessel
Merchant submarine

References
Notes

Sources

External links

US Navy Submarine Force Museum: Official home of USS NautilusNautilus Alumni Association : Information for former Nautilus crewmembers
: USS Nautilus''
Documents regarding the USS Nautilus (SSN-571), Dwight D. Eisenhower Presidential Library

Photo gallery of USS Nautilus at NavSource.org
Old NavSource USS Nautilus Photo gallery

 

1954 ships
Cold War submarines of the United States
Experimental nuclear submarines of the United States Navy
Nuclear submarines of the United States Navy
Ships built in Groton, Connecticut
Submarines of the United States Navy
Recipients of the Presidential Unit Citation (United States)

Arctic exploration vessels
Exploration of the Arctic
Nuclear history of the United States

Buildings and structures in Groton, Connecticut
Military and war museums in Connecticut
Museums in New London County, Connecticut
Museum ships in Connecticut
National Register of Historic Places in New London County, Connecticut
Ships on the National Register of Historic Places in Connecticut
Symbols of Connecticut
Tourist attractions in New London County, Connecticut
Naval History and Heritage Command
North Pole